is a city located in Fukuoka Prefecture, Japan. As of August 31, 2016, the city has an estimated population of 112,894 and a population density of 7,978.37 persons per km². The total area is 14.15 km².

The city was founded on April 1, 1972. It is directly south of Fukuoka City, and west of Onojo. It also has a border with Nakagawa. Kasuga station is on the JR Kagoshima Main Line, while Kasugabaru Station is on the Nishitetsu Tenjin Ōmuta Line. The Hakata-Minami Line also terminates here.

The Japan Air Self-Defense Force has its western regional headquarters here, namely the Kasuga Air Base. There is a Seiyu mall, and several large parks. Kasuga Park  has a baseball stadium, a football stadium, tennis courts, and a children's playground with a large jungle gym.  Shirozu Park (白水大池公園) has a children's adventure playground and a large lake. There are also several reservoirs in the area. Also, there are a lot of cherry blossoms during the spring season. 
There are 12 elementary schools, 6 middle schools, 1 high school, and 2 universities/community colleges in Kasuga. Kasuga is well known for having many temples and traditional events such as Kasuga Andon Festival.

Notable people from Kasuga 
Yū Aoi – actress and model
Toshiya Sugiuchi – baseball player

References

External links

 Kasuga City official website 

Cities in Fukuoka Prefecture